Telugu cinema, popularly known as Tollywood, consisting of films in the Telugu language. It is the second largest film production centre in India. In 1977, the film Adavi Ramudu starring N. T. Rama Rao become the first film to collect one crore. The 1992 film Gharana Mogudu, directed by K. Raghavendra Rao and starring Chiranjeevi, is the first Telugu film to gross over  10 crore at the box office.

The following is a list of the highest-grossing Telugu films (including dubbed and simultaneously filmed versions) based on gross.

NOTE: Since Telugu film collection figures have no certain sources, figures are provided on the basis of many sources. Though figures contradict with some reliable sources in some cases, figures which are cited in most sources are only described.

Highest-grossing films worldwide 
The Telugu films which grossed a minimum of 150 crore worldwide are listed here.

Highest-grossing films in India

Andhra Pradesh and Telangana

Karnataka

Worldwide opening records

Biggest worldwide opening day gross

Biggest worldwide opening week gross

Highest-grossing films by month

Highest-grossing films by year

Highest-grossing films in the United States 

The USA gross figures film which have grossed $2 million ore more are only listed here.

Highest-grossing film franchises

See also

 List of highest-grossing Indian films
 List of highest-grossing Tamil films
 List of highest-grossing Hindi films
 List of highest-grossing Kannada films
 List of highest-grossing Malayalam films
 List of highest-grossing Punjabi films
 List of highest-grossing Indian Bengali films
 List of highest-grossing South Indian Films

Notes

References

Telugu
Telugu films